Agricultural Centre ( – Markaz Amūzesh-e Keshāvarzī) is an agricultural centre and village in Zangiabad Rural District, in the Central District of Kerman County, Kerman Province, Iran. At the 2006 census, its population was 64, in 17 families.

References 

Populated places in Kerman County